Hypostomus itacua is a species of catfish in the family Loricariidae. It is a freshwater fish native to South America, where it occurs in the middle Paraná River basin. The species reaches 11 cm (4.3 inches) in total length and is believed to be a facultative air-breather. The type specimen of the species is apparently lost and its classification within Loricariidae is uncertain. It is sometimes treated as a species of Hemiancistrus.

References 

Hypostominae
Fish described in 1836